Crinivirus, formerly the lettuce infectious yellows virus group, is a genus of viruses, in the family Closteroviridae. They are linear, single-stranded positive sense RNA viruses (and are therefore group IV). There are 14 species in this genus. Diseases associated with this genus include: yellowing and necrosis, particularly affecting the phloem.

Examples of species whose entire genomes have been sequenced that are currently classified into the genus include the Sweet potato chlorotic stunt virus (SPCSV) and the Lettuce infectious yellows virus (LIYV).

Genetics
The viruses of this genus have segmented, bipartite genomes that add up to 7,500–19,500 nucleotides in length. Their genomes also code for proteins that do not form part of the virion particles as well as structural proteins. The Universal Virus Database describes that their genome sequences near their 3'-ends are capable of hairpin-loop formation and also believe that their 5'-ends may have methylated caps. Each of the viral RNA molecules contains four hair-pin structures and a pseudoknot in the 3'UTR. The pseudoknot is unusual in that it contains a small stem-loop structure inside loop L1. In the related genus Closterovirus, these secondary structures have been found to be important in viral RNA replication.

Structure
Viruses in the genus Crinivirus are non-enveloped, with bipartite filamentous geometries. The diameter is around 10-13 nm, with a length of 700-900 nm. Genomes are linear and bipartite, around 17.6kb in length.

Life cycle
Viral replication is cytoplasmic. Entry into the host cell is achieved by penetration into the host cell. Replication follows the positive stranded RNA virus replication model. Positive stranded RNA virus transcription is the method of transcription. The virus exits the host cell by tubule-guided viral movement.
Plants serve as the natural host. The virus is transmitted via a vector (bemisia tabaci). Transmission route is mechanical.

Taxonomy
The following species are assigned to the genus:
Abutilon yellows virus
Bean yellow disorder virus
Beet pseudoyellows virus
Blackberry yellow vein-associated virus
Cucurbit yellow stunting disorder virus
Diodia vein chlorosis virus
Lettuce chlorosis virus
Lettuce infectious yellows virus
Potato yellow vein virus
Strawberry pallidosis-associated virus
Sweet potato chlorotic stunt virus
Tetterwort vein chlorosis virus
Tomato chlorosis virus
Tomato infectious chlorosis virus

References

External links

 ICTV Report: Closteroviridae
 Viralzone: Crinivirus
 Rfam entry for 3'-terminal pseudoknot in SPCSV
 Rfam entry for 3'-terminal pseudoknot of CuYV/BPYV
 Rfam entry for 3'-terminal pseudoknot in PYVV

 
Closteroviridae
Viral plant pathogens and diseases
Virus genera